Santa Ana Municipality or Santa Ana del Yacuma Municipality is a municipality of the Beni Department, Bolivia.

References 

Municipalities of Beni Department